Sobia is a cool drink, which is famous in the Hejaz region of Saudi Arabia and in Egypt. Sobia is usually produced in Saudi Arabia from bread, barley or oats, while in Egypt the drink is produced from Rice, coconut powder and dairy products. The drink is widely produced in and consumed during Ramadan.

Production 
Sobia syrup is made from the ingredients of barley, dry bread, oats or raisins, after which filtering are added amounts of sugar, cardamom and cinnamon mixed in proportional amounts, then ice is added to it for cooling.

It is presented in multiple colours, white, which is the colour of barley, red with strawberry flavour, brown when tamarind is added to it, and it is recommended to eat it within two or three days because it loses its nutritional value after that. It is generally considered a refreshing drink. There are other methods of preparing it based on milk and vanilla, which is the most common method in Egypt.

Alcohol and Fermentation 
The Saudi Food and Drug Authority indicated that there is a small percentage of ethanol (alcohol) that results from the self-fermentation process of juices and drinks, which are natural chemical reactions with added sugar.

Sobia is considered fermentable when stored for more than 2 days, and research has been conducted to determine the percentage of intoxicating ethyl alcohol in sobia samples, and it reached 2.3% after 24 hours, and increased to 4.2% after 48 hours, until it reached 6.8% after 72 hours.

References

External links 

 A microbiological study of Sobia: a fermented beverage in the Western province of Saudi Arabia, Mustafa A.A. Gassem, ResearchGate

Saudi Arabian cuisine
Alcoholic drinks in Asia
Egyptian cuisine
m,n,